The British Rail Class 350 is a class of electric multiple-unit built by Siemens Transportation Systems to its Desiro design between 2004 and 2014. All 87 are now operated by West Midlands Trains, having previously been operated by Central Trains, Silverlink, Southern, London Midland, First TransPennine Express and TransPennine Express.

Description

The Class 350/1 units were originally part of an order for 32 five-car  units for South West Trains. However, they were never built as such. Of the 160 carriages ordered, 40 were diverted as an additional 10 four-car Class 450 units, and the remaining 120 were modified as 30 four-car Class 350/1 units. These entered service in 2005 and were used jointly by Central Trains and Silverlink, both owned by National Express. The top speed of the fleet was originally , but all 350/1s were modified to allow  running from December 2012, in order to make better use of paths on the busy West Coast Main Line.

In late 2007, a second batch of 37 was ordered by London Midland to replace its s. Designated as Class 350/2 units, they entered service between 2008 and 2009. Class 350/2s differ from the Class 350/1 units in two key aspects: having 3+2 seating in standard class (because they work short-hop commuter services; the Class 350/1 used for longer distance services are 2+2 throughout) and lack the dual-voltage capability of the 350/1. This was to allow the operators to run mixed 350/1 and 350/2 services without causing delays, especially important given the capacity changes which HS2 works at London Euston were expected to cause.

Between 2013 and 2014, a further 20 were manufactured for London Midland and First TransPennine Express. Each took on ten units, the former designated the Class 350/3 and the latter the Class 350/4.

Class 350 trains are nearly identical to those of Class 450. The latter class is only fitted with traction equipment for Southern Region 750 V DC third rail, whilst the Class 350/1 units can operate from either  OLE, as is done in regular service, or alternatively third rail. This dual-voltage capability was utilised when several units were leased to Southern in 2009, in order to cover for similarly equipped Class 377/2 units temporarily sub-leased to First Capital Connect. All Class 350 units built since are not equipped for third-rail use but, like most modern British EMUs, can be retrofitted if necessary.

Every set of doors has its own set of guard-operated door controls behind a lockable panel. The cabs have three radio systems - Cab Secure Radio (CSR), National Radio Network (NRN), and the newest system, GSM-R. CCTV and dot-matrix destination screens are fitted throughout the train.

Current operation

West Midlands Trains 
All of London Midland's 77 Class 350s were inherited by West Midlands Trains on 9 December 2017. WMT operate all of the units primarily under its London Northwestern Railway brand, however some units also run routes under the West Midlands Railway brand at times. A further 10 were transferred from TransPennine Express in 2019–20.

The fleet is based at the purpose-built Kings Heath depot at Kingsthorpe, which opened in June 2006. In May 2021, they took over services on the Abbey line from Class 319s.

Former operations

Central Trains / Silverlink 

Central Trains and Silverlink shared the 30 Class 350/1 units from 2005 to 2007. They were operated as a common user fleet in a neutral grey and blue livery.

The first entered service in June 2005 with Central Trains. These operated on services between Birmingham and Northampton via Coventry, and all Birmingham - Liverpool services, replacing s. Later on, the units also took over some peak services between Birmingham and Walsall.

Silverlink began operating the fleet in June 2005 between London Euston, Milton Keynes Central and Northampton.

The Central Trains and Silverlink franchises expired in November 2007.

London Midland 

Once the Central Trains and Silverlink franchises expired, the entire Class 350 fleet transferred to London Midland with the West Midlands franchise.

As part of the franchise agreement, London Midland ordered 37 additional Class 350s. On 8 October 2008, the first of these was handed over to Porterbrook and carried invited guests around the Wildenrath Test Track. The first ten 350/2 units entered service in December 2008 and the final unit was officially delivered to London Midland on 30 July 2009. In addition to the existing operations, these units took over the new Crewe - London Euston service running via Stoke-on-Trent and stopping at most of the Trent Valley line stations.

Several Class 350/1 units were subleased to Southern in 2009, to provide cover for Class 377/2 units subleased to First Capital Connect, themselves to cover for delays in the construction of the Class 377/5 fleet. All were returned within the year.

A further 10 four-car units were built later on in the franchise to provide additional capacity, entering service from October 2014 as Class 350/3s.

TransPennine Express

In 2013, ten Class 350/4 units were introduced for First TransPennine Express services between Manchester and Edinburgh / Glasgow, coinciding with the completion of the electrification of the eastern section of the Manchester to Liverpool via Newton-le-Willows line. The first First TransPennine Express Class 350/4 services ran on 30 December 2013 between Manchester Piccadilly and Glasgow Central. The introduction of these units allowed most services on the Manchester to Scotland route to be operated using EMUs, displacing the Class 185s which were cascaded to other routes to enhance capacity. The units were based at Siemens' existing Ardwick depot in Manchester, with the government providing funding for the required electrification.

Following the transfer of the franchise to TransPennine Express in 2016, 12 Class 397 Civity units were ordered to replace the Class 350s on TransPennine North West services. All ten moved to West Midlands Trains, in 2019 and 2020.

Future
London Northwestern Railway has announced it will be replacing the Class 350/2 units with Class 730 Aventras. In October 2018, Porterbrook, which owns the Class 350/2 units, announced that it was considering to convert them into battery electric multiple units for potential future cascades to non-electrified routes.

Fleet details
The Class 350/1s, 350/3s and 350/4s are owned by Angel Trains, and the Class 350/2s are owned by Porterbrook.

Named units
350110 - Project 110
350111 - Apollo
350115 - Archimedes
350232 - Chad Varah
350370 - Lichfield Festival
350375 - Vic Hall
350377 - Graham Taylor OBE

Accidents and incidents
In 2005, units 350105 and 350108 were damaged after colliding with a falling tree. Both were returned to Germany for repairs.

On 16 September 2016, unit 350264 struck a landslide at the entrance to Watford Tunnel and derailed. It was then hit by unit 350233 travelling in the opposite direction. Two people were injured and unit 350264 was severely damaged. The leading carriage of unit 350233 was severely damaged, and all four carriages were damaged along one side. The consequences were not as serious as they could potentially have been because the derailed train was fortuitously kept from diverging too far from its line by equipment on the bottom of the train catching on the rail, meaning unit 350233 struck only a glancing blow. On 10 November 2016, unit 350264 was moved to Germany by low-loader, followed later by 350233. Both re-entered service in early 2018.

References

External links

350
Siemens multiple units
Train-related introductions in 2005
750 V DC multiple units
25 kV AC multiple units